Statistics of Division 2 in the 1978/1979 season.

Overview
It was contested by 36 teams, and Gueugnon and Stade Brest won the championship.

League tables

Group A

Group B

Championship play-offs

|}

Promotion play-offs

|}
Lens was qualified to the play-off against 19th placed team of Division 1, Paris FC.

References
France - List of final tables (RSSSF)

Ligue 2 seasons
French
2